Marco Bonanomi (born 12 March 1985 in Lecco) is an Italian professional racing driver.

Career

Formula Renault

Bonanomi began his car racing career in 2001 by competing in a few rounds of the Formula Renault Eurocup and Italian Formula Renault championships with the Cram Competition team. He took part in the same series in 2002, but moved to the RP Motorsport team.

Four years later, Bonanomi drove in four races of the 2006 Formula Renault 3.5 Series season for Tech 1 Racing, starting his current career trend. He completed a full season in the formula in 2007, finishing 12th in the Drivers' Championship for the RC Motorsport team. In 2008, he drove in the series again, this time for the Comtec team. He survived a horrendous crash at the season finale at the Circuit de Catalunya. Running behind Mikhail Aleshin on the front straight, Bonanomi jinked out to make a pass but touched wheels with the Russian which launched him into the air and after hitting the bottom of the scoring tower, his car landed upside down on the grass beside the pit exit. He was unhurt, but his car was unrepairable, thus meaning his season was over.

Formula Three
From 2003 to 2005 Bonanomi focussed on Formula Three competing in the Italian championship and the Euro Series, as well as a number of one-off races. During this period he drove for the former Formula One team, Coloni, and another run by retired F1 driver and compatriot Piercarlo Ghinzani.

Formula 3000
For 2006, Bonanomi drove in the Euroseries 3000 for the Fisichella Motor Sport team. He finished runner-up in the Drivers' Championship with six pole positions and wins from eighteen starts; his most successful stint yet in motorsport.

Formula Master
In addition to a full World Series by Renault campaign in 2007, Bonanomi also competed in selected rounds of the inaugural International Formula Master series, achieving in final placing of fifteenth in the Drivers' Championship.

GP2 Series
In the early part of 2008, Bonanomi drove in another new motorsport championship: the GP2 Asia Series. Driving for the Minardi Piquet Sports team, he won the final race of the season in Dubai, the most prestigious win of his racing career so far. He returned to the GP2 Asia Series in the 2008–09 championship, replacing Alex Yoong at Qi-Meritus Mahara from the January Bahrain meeting onwards. This was due to Yoong lacking sufficient time for racing.

Racing record

Career summary

† As he was guest driver Bonanomi was ineligible to score points.

Complete Formula 3 Euro Series results
(key) (Races in bold indicate pole position) (Races in italics indicate fastest lap)

Complete Formula V8 3.5 Series results
(key) (Races in bold indicate pole position) (Races in italics indicate fastest lap)

Complete GP2 Series results

Complete GP2 Asia Series results
(key) (Races in bold indicate pole position) (Races in italics indicate fastest lap)

24 Hours of Le Mans results

Complete FIA World Endurance Championship results

Complete Blancpain Sprint Series results

References

  Retrieved on 3 July 2008.

External links
  
 

1985 births
Sportspeople from Lecco
Living people
Italian racing drivers
Auto GP drivers
Formula 3 Euro Series drivers
Formula Renault Eurocup drivers
Italian Formula Renault 2.0 drivers
International Formula Master drivers
GP2 Asia Series drivers
World Series Formula V8 3.5 drivers
24 Hours of Le Mans drivers
Blancpain Endurance Series drivers
24 Hours of Spa drivers
ADAC GT Masters drivers
Cram Competition drivers
RP Motorsport drivers
Scuderia Coloni drivers
Target Racing drivers
Prema Powerteam drivers
Tech 1 Racing drivers
RC Motorsport drivers
Euronova Racing drivers
Piquet GP drivers
Comtec Racing drivers
Team Meritus drivers
Audi Sport drivers
Team Joest drivers
Kolles Racing drivers
Australian Endurance Championship drivers
ISR Racing drivers
W Racing Team drivers
WeatherTech SportsCar Championship drivers
Audi Sport TT Cup drivers
International GT Open drivers
Saintéloc Racing drivers